Fantastic Four (Original Motion Picture Soundtrack) is the soundtrack album to the 2015 film Fantastic Four. Directed by Josh Trank, the film is based on the Marvel Comics superhero team of the same name, and is a reboot of the Fantastic Four film franchise. The musical score is composed by Marco Beltrami and Philip Glass, and the album was released in digital and physical formats on August 7, 2015 by Sony Classical Records, coinciding the film's release. It was also released in two-disc vinyl sets on August 10. Apart from featuring Beltrami and Glass' score, it also featured an original song "Another Body" performed by El-P and a single "Fantastic" performed by RM and Mandy Ventrice. The latter was only used for promotional purposes for the South Korean theatrical release, and is not featured in the film or the soundtrack.

Development 
In January 2015, Marco Beltrami was hired to compose the film's score and later that month, veteran composer Philip Glass was also hired to work on the score. Miles Hankins, Brandon Roberts, Marcus Trumpp and Buck Sanders provided additional music for the film. American hip-hop recording artist El-P scored the end credits of the film.

Beltrami attended the 2015 San Diego Comic-Con International held in July 2015, to discuss scoring the film. He described the score as "eerie" and "mysterious", landing it in a "musical territory leaning towards fantasy." A musical piece from the prelude was scored by Glass, from which Beltrami had adapted several of its cues from the film's music. Beltrami had opined that the score will be "darker" than that of the previous Fantastic Four film scores (composed by John Ottman) and he added that "the most important goal was to capture the innocence and curiosity of the kids who get exposed to interstellar radiation and become superheroes". He did not create individual themes for the film, but instead had created individual elements that come together.

Promotional singles 
On July 24, 2015, El-P announced the promotional single titled "Another Body" for the film, and was later released during the live performance of his band Run the Jewels at the Beats 1 show on July 25. The song was later featured as a bonus track in the digital streaming releases of the album. To promote the film, Kim Nam-joon, known as RM of the K-pop group BTS, and American recording artist Mandy Ventrice, worked on the digital single "Fantastic", which was released alongside the South Korean run of the film. The accompanying music video was released on August 3.

Track listing

Reception 
In spite of the film's extremely negative reception, the soundtrack still garnered a positive response. Jørn Tillnes of Soundtrack Geek gave a 57 percent score to the album saying "If you’re looking for another Marvel superhero score to match the latest trend, then you’ll find some of it here." Mihnea Manduteanu of Soundtrack Dreams gave 80/100 to the score and praised Glass' co-contribution to the score, while opining that Beltrami's efforts are lost in the film. Robert Trate of Sci-Fi Movie Page called it as an "amazing collection of music that should be listened to while reading a Fantastic Four comic". Brian Lowry, writing for Variety, had opined that Beltrami and Glass "yields some intriguing riffs in what ultimately sounds like a pretty conventional score".

James Southall of Movie Wave wrote "The opening and particularly the closing parts of the album are strong, thoroughly entertaining and impressive.  The Philip Glass bits – which disappear almost completely the closer the score gets to its conclusion – do add a bit of curiosity value, but to be honest no more than that.  The star of the show is Marco Beltrami’s action music towards the end." Filmtracks.com wrote "The entirety of the score is interesting in parts but extremely underachieving given its original potential. It goes without saying that nothing from John Ottman's prior music for the franchise survives here, except for the concept's inability to escape from rather mediocre filler music outside of its blatant thematic expressions. It's an adequate but disengaged endeavor."

Chart performance

Personnel 
Credits adapted from CD liner notes

 Production
 Music by – Marco Beltrami, Philip Glass
 Additional music – Brandon Roberts, Marcus Trumpp, Miles Hankins, Buck Sanders
 Recording – Vincent Cirrilli, John Kurlander
 Mixing – Tyson Lozensky, John Kurlander
 Mastering – Erick Labson
 Musicians
 Bass – Bart Samolis, David Parmeter, Drew Dembowski, Edward Meares, Michael Valerio, Nico Abondolo, Stephen Dress
 Bassoon – Ken Munday, Rose Corrigan
 Cello – Andrew Shulman, Armen Ksajikian, Cecilia Tsan, Dennis Karmazyn, Evgeny Tonkha, Paula Hochhalter, Steve Erdody, Timothy Landauer, Xiaodan Zheng
 Clarinet – Gary Bovyer, Ralph Williams
 Flute – Geri Rotella, Jennifer Olson, Sara Andon
 French horn – Benjamin Jaber, Daniel Kelley, David Everson, Jenny L. Kim, Laura Brenes, Mark Adams, Steven Becknell
 Harp – Marcia Dickstein
 Oboe – Leslie Reed, Phil Ayling
 Percussion – Alan Estes, Gregory Goodall, Marvin Gordy III, Wade Culbreath
 Piano – Bryan Pezzone
 Trombone – Alan Kaplan, Alexander Iles, William Reichenbach, William Booth
 Trumpet – Barry Perkins, Christopher Still, David Washburn, Jon Lewis
 Tuba – Doug Tornquist
 Viola – Alma Fernandez, Andrew Duckles, Brian Dembow, David Walther, Luke Maurer, Maria Newman, Matthew Funes, Michael Nowak, Robert Brophy, Scott Hosfeld, Shawn Mann, Victoria Miskolczy
 Violin – Alyssa Park, Bruce Dukov, Charlie Bisharat, Darius Campo, Elizabeth Hedman, Grace Oh, Helen Nightengale, Irina Voloshina, Jessica Guideri, Josefina Vergara, Julie Gigante, Katia Popov, Kevin Connolly, Lisa Liu, Lisa Sutton, Natalie Leggett, Neil Samples, Phillip Levy, Rafael Rishik, Roberto Cani, Roger Wilkie, Sandra Cameron, Sarah Thornblade, Serena McKinney, Shalini Vijayan, Songa Lee, Steven Zander, Tamara Hatwan, Tereza Stanislav
 Orchestra
 Orchestra conductor – Pete Anthony
 Orchestra contractor – Peter Rotter
 Orchestrator – Andrew Kinney, Dana Niu, Jon Kull, Mark Graham (3), Pete Anthony, Richard Bronskill, Rossano Galante
 Concertmistress – Belinda Broughton
 Stage engineer – Denis St. Amand
 Stage Manager – Damon Tedesco, Tom Steel

Notes

References 

2015 soundtrack albums
Fantastic Four in other media
Philip Glass soundtracks
Sony Classical Records soundtracks
Marvel Comics film soundtracks